On the Indonesian island of Sulawesi, 114 native languages are spoken, all of which belong to the Malayo-Polynesian subgroup of the  Austronesian language family. With a total number of 17,200,000 inhabitants (2015 estimate, based on census data from 2010), Sulawesi displays a high linguistic diversity when compared with the most densely populated Indonesian island Java, which hosts 4–8 languages (depending on count) spoken by 145,100,000 inhabitants.

Classification 
All but three of the languages of Sulawesi belong to one of the following five subgroups, which are almost exclusively spoken on Sulawesi:
Gorontalo–Mongondow languages
Sangiric languages
Minahasan languages
Celebic languages
South Sulawesi languages

The remaining three languages are affiliated to subgroups which are primarily found outside of Sulawesi. Indonesian Bajau belongs to the Sama–Bajaw languages, and is spoken by scattered, traditionally nomadic coastal communities (locally known as Bajo people) which are distributed in many areas of eastern Indonesia. Makassar Malay and Manado Malay are Malay-based creoles.

The Gorontalo–Mongondow languages are part of the Greater Central Philippine languages, and thus more closely related to the languages of the central and southern Philippines than to other  languages of Sulawesi. The Sangiric and Minahasan languages are included in the proposed Philippine subgroup, which also comprises the Greater Central Philippine languages and several other subgroups of the Philippines.

The Celebic and South Sulawesi languages are primary branches of Malayo-Polynesian.

Language vitality 
Some languages, like Buginese (five million speakers) and Makassarese (two million speakers), are widely distributed and vigorously used. Many of the languages with much smaller numbers of speakers are also still vigorously spoken, but some languages are almost extinct, because language use of the ethnic population has shifted to the dominant regional language, e.g. in the case of Ponosakan, with four remaining speakers.

List of languages

Gorontalo–Mongondow languages

The Gorontalo–Mongondow languages are spoken in the provinces of Gorontalo, North Sulawesi and Central Sulawesi. The following internal classification is based on Sneddon & Usup (1986):

Mongondowic: Mongondow, Ponosakan
Gorontalic: Bintauna, Bolango, Buol, Gorontalo, Kaidipang, Lolak, Suwawa

Sangiric languages

The Sangiric languages are spoken in North Sulawesi, and in the southern Philippines on the Sarangani Islands off the southern coast of Mindanao. The following internal classification is based on Sneddon (1984):
North Sangiric: Sangir, Talaud (Sangil – not spoken on Sulawesi)
South Sangiric: Bantik, Ratahan

Minahasan languages

The Minahasan languages are spoken in North Sulawesi. The following internal classification is based on Sneddon (1978):
Tonsawang
North Minahasan: Tombulu, Tondano, Tonsea, Tontemboan

South Sulawesi languages

The South Sulawesi languages are mainly spoken in the provinces of South Sulawesi and West Sulawesi. Languages of the Tamanic branch are spoken outside of Sulawesi in West Borneo. The following internal classification is based on Friberg and Laskowske (1989):
Lemolang
Seko: Budong-Budong, Panasuan, Seko Padang, Seko Tengah
Northern
Mamuju
Mandar
Massenrempulu: Duri, Enrekang, Maiwa, Malimpung
Pitu Ulunna Salu: Aralle-Tabulahan, Bambam, Dakka, Pannei, Ulumanda'
Toraja: Kalumpang, Mamasa, Tae', Talondo', Toraja-Sa'dan
Bugis–Tamanic
Bugis: Buginese, Campalagian
(Tamanic: Embaloh, Taman – not spoken on Sulawesi)
Makassaric: Bentong, Coastal Konjo, Highland Konjo, Makassarese, Selayar

Celebic languages

The Celebic languages are primarily spoken in Central Sulawesi and Southeast Sulawesi, and also in parts of South Sulawesi and West Sulawesi. The following internal classification is based on the Ethnologue:
Tomini–Tolitoli languages
Tolitoli: Boano, Totoli
Tomini: Balaesang, Dampelas, Dondo, Lauje, Pendau, Taje, Tajio, Tomini
Kaili–Pamona languages
Northern
Kaili: Baras, Da’a Kaili, Ledo Kaili, Unde Kaili, Lindu, Moma, Sedoa, Topoiyo
Pamona: Pamona, Tombelala
Southern
Badaic: Bada, Behoa, Napu
Rampi
Sarudu
Uma
Wotu–Wolio languages
Wotu
Kalao–Laiyolo: Kalao, Laiyolo
Wolio–Kamaru: Kamaru, Wolio
Eastern Celebic
Saluan–Banggai languages
Eastern: Balantak, Banggai, 
Saluanic: Andio, Batui, Bobongko, Saluan 
Southeastern Celebic
Bungku–Tolaki languages
Eastern
Moronene
East Coast: Bahonsuai, Bungku, Koroni, Kulisusu, Mori Bawah, Taloki, Wawonii
Western
Interior: Mori Atas, Padoe, Tomadino
West Coast: Kodeoha, Rahambuu, Tolaki, Waru
Muna–Buton languages
Tukang Besi–Bonerate: Bonerate, Tukang Besi North, Tukang Besi South
Nuclear Muna–Buton
Buton
East Buton: Kumbewaha, Lasalimu
Cia-Cia
Munan
Busoa
Munic
Kaimbulawa
Western: Kioko, Liabuku, Muna, Pancana

See also 
Languages of Indonesia

Notes

References

Further reading 
 
 

 

Sulawesi